Hadrurus arizonensis, the giant desert hairy scorpion, giant hairy scorpion, or Arizona Desert hairy scorpion is a large scorpion found in North America.

Description
This species is usually yellow with a dark top and has crab-like pincers. It gets its common names from the brown hairs that cover its body. These hairs help it to detect vibration in the soil. Females of the species tend to have wider, stockier bodies, while males tend to have larger pincers. A similar species is Hadrurus spadix.

Habitat

Hadrurus arizonensis is distributed throughout the Sonoran and Mojave deserts. In Mexico, the species' range flanks the Gulf of California in Sonora and Baja California Norte. In the United States, it is found in the western two thirds of Arizona, the Colorado Desert and Mojave Desert regions of southern California, southern Nevada, and extreme southwestern Utah. Arizona Desert hairy scorpions are a warm-desert species, specially adapted to hot and dry conditions. They are usually found in and around washes or low-elevation valleys where they dig elaborate burrows (up to ) and emerge at night to forage for prey and mates. Other species commonly encountered living sympatrically with this species are: Smeringurus mesaensis, Hoffmannius confusus, and Hoffmannius spinigerus.

Diet and behavior
It is a burrowing scorpion, but is commonly found under rocks containing moisture. Its diet consists of large insects, spiders, and small vertebrates. Its competitors include the giant desert centipede which is also a natural predator to the scorpion. This is an active and aggressive, if provoked, scorpion, which, as with all scorpions, is nocturnal. Like all scorpions, the giant desert hairy scorpion gives birth to live young, which remain on the mother's back for a week or more before leaving.

Toxicity
Although this scorpion is big, its venom is not very potent, and its sting is commonly perceived to be about as painful as a honeybee's sting. The venom has an  value of 168 mg/kg. However, an allergic reaction to its venom can be fatal; symptoms can include difficulty breathing, excessive swelling, and prolonged pain.

References

Scorpions of North America
Animals described in 1928